Usiququmadevu or Isiququmadevu is a creature from Zulu mythology. She is a bearded, bloated monster who eats every living thing she comes across. 

Usiququmadevu is said to have a husband of the same name.

Legend
According to legend, one day she came upon the children of a chief. As they were unguarded, she quickly swallowed them. The chief discovered what had happened and instantly set out to find her. Soon he did and killed her by stabbing her in the hump; his children emerged unscathed from her mouth.

References

Zulu legendary creatures